En Vazhi Thani Vazhi is a 1988 Indian Tamil-language film directed by V. Azhagappan, starring Raghuvaran, supported by Geetha, Nishanthi and S. S. Chandran. The film became more popular after actor Rajinikanth used the punch line En Vazhi Thani Vazhi in his 1999 film Padayappa.

Plot 
En Vazhi Thani Vazhi is the story of a person, Advocate Raja who takes on corrupt system.

Cast 
Raghuvaran – Advocate Raja 
Geetha
Nishanthi
S. S. Chandran
Senthil

Soundtrack 
Soundtrack was composed by Chandrabose.
"Enga Koottam" – Malaysia Vasudevan
"Kadhal Paravai" – K. S. Chithra
"Pillai Pookkal" – K. S. Chithra
"Mama Azhagu" – S. P. Sailaja
"Ezhunthal" – Vanitha
"Dhaayam Podu" – S. P. Sailaja

References

External links 
 

1980s Tamil-language films
1988 action films
1988 films
Films directed by V. Azhagappan
Indian action films